The First Puerto Rican Senate, under United States occupation, was the first meeting of senators of the Senate of Puerto Rico elected as part of the legislative branch of their government. Elections for the Senate of Puerto Rico were authorized by passage of the Jones-Shafroth Act in 1917. It authorized elections to be held on July 6, 1917 for representative government in the legislature.

The Senate met from August 13, 1917, to January 2, 1920. The voters elected a majority of members from the Union of Puerto Rico party, who chose Antonio R. Barceló as President of the Senate.

Party summary

Leadership

Members

Employees

 Secretary:
 José Muñoz Rivera
 Assistant Secretary:
 Eugenio Astol
 Sergeant at Arms:
 Manuel Palacios Salazar

References

External links
Elecciones 1917

Politics of Puerto Rico
Political organizations based in Puerto Rico
Political history of Puerto Rico